Devapala (Bangla: দেবপাল)(9th century) was the most powerful ruler of the Pala Empire of Bengal region in the Indian Subcontinent. He was the third king in the line, and  had succeeded his father Dharamapala. Devapala expanded the frontiers of the empire by conquering the present-day Assam and Orissa. The Pala inscriptions also credit him with several other victories, but these claims are thought to be exaggerated.

Reign 

Devapala was the third king in the line, and  had succeeded his father Dharamapala. His mother was Rannadevi, a Rashtrakuta princess. Earlier historians considered Devapala as a nephew of Dharmapala, based on the Bhagalpur copper plate of Narayanapala, which mentions Devapala as Jayapala's purvajabhrata (interpreted as "elder brother"). Jayapala is mentioned as the son of Dharmapala's brother Vakpala in multiple Pala inscriptions. However, the discovery of the Munger (Monghyr) copper inscription changed this view. This particular inscription clearly describes Devapala as the son of Dharmapala.

Based on the different interpretations of the various epigraphs and historical records, the different historians estimate Devapala's reign as follows:

Expansion of the Pala Empire 

Devapala launched military campaigns under his cousin and his general Jayapala, who was the son of Dharmapala's younger brother Vakpala. These expeditions resulted in the invasion of Pragjyotisha (present-day Assam) where the king submitted without giving a fight and Utkala (present-day Odisha) whose ruler fled from his capital city.

The highly exaggerated Badal Pillar inscription of a later Pala king Narayanapala states that Devpala's empire extended up to the Vindhyas, the Himalayas, and the two oceans (presumably the Arabian Sea and the Bay of Bengal). It also claims that Devpala exterminated the Utkalas (present-day Orissa), conquered the Pragjyotisha (Assam), shattered the pride of the Hunas, humbled the lords of Gurjara and the Dravidas. These claims are exaggerated, but cannot be dismissed entirely: the neighbouring kingdoms of Rashtrakutas and the Gurjara-Pratiharas were weak at the time, and may have been subdued by Devapala.

The "Gurjaras" in the inscription refers to the Gurjara-Pratiharas led by Mihira Bhoja. The Hunas probably refers to a principality in North-West India. "Dravida" is generally believed to be a reference to the Rashtrakutas (led by Amoghavarsha), but RC Majumdar believes that it may refer to the Pandyan king Sri Mara Sri Vallabha. However, there is no definitive record of any expedition of Devapala to the extreme south. In any case, his victory in the south could only have been a temporary one, and his dominion lay mainly in the north.

While an ancient country with the name Kamboja was located in what is now Afghanistan, there is no evidence that Devapala's empire extended that far. Kamboja, in this inscription, could refer to the Kamboja tribe that had entered North India (see Kamboja Pala dynasty). The Munger copper plate (Monghyr Charter) indicates that the Palas recruited their war horses from the Kambojas, and there might have been a Kamboja cavalry in the Pala armed forces. Viradeva, a scholar appointed by him as the abbot of Nalanda, is believed to be a native of Nagarahara (identified with modern-day Jalalabad). This has led some scholars to speculate if Devapala indeed launched a military expedition to the present-day Afghanistan, during which he met Viradeva. But some historians believe that Devapala defeated the Arab rulers of the north west.

Religious leanings 

Devapala was a staunch sponsor of Buddhism, and approved the construction of many temples and monasteries in Magadha. He maintained the famous Buddhist monastery at Uddandapura (Odantapuri). Buton Rinchen Drub credits his father Dharmapala for building the monastery, although other Tibetan accounts such as that of Taranatha, state that it was magically built and then entrusted to Devapala.

Balaputradeva, the Sailendra king of Java, sent an ambassador to him, asking for a grant of five villages for the construction of a monastery at Nalanda. The request was granted by Devapala. He also patronized the Vikramashila University and the Nalanda University.

Buddhist scholar Vajradatta (the author of Lokesvarashataka), was the court poet of Devapala.

Successor 

Devapala ruled for about 40 years. His oldest son probably was the Crown Prince(Yuvaraja) Rajyapala. However, he probably died before his father. Earlier, the historians believed his successor to be Shurapala I and/or Vigrahapala I. In the 2000s, a copper-plate grant was discovered at Jagjivanpur: this plate mentions that a hitherto unknown Pala king, Mahendrapala, had issued the grant in 854 CE. Mahendrapala was the son of Devapala and brother of Shurapala I. Both Mahendrapala and Shurapala I were born to Queen Mahata.

In popular culture 

Devapala's exploits -- both verified and legendary -- inspired the Bengali campaign in Dynasties of India, the 2022 expansion pack for Age of Empires II: Definitive Edition.

See also 
 List of rulers of Bengal

References 

Pala kings
Year of death unknown
Year of birth unknown
Indian Buddhist monarchs